Tsietsi Mahoa (born 9 February 1982) is a South African former soccer player who played as a defender. He played for Wits University,  Supersport United, Bloemfontein Celtic, Moroka Swallows and the South Africa national soccer team.

References

1982 births
Living people
South African soccer players
People from Tembisa
Soccer players from Gauteng
Association football defenders
Bidvest Wits F.C. players
SuperSport United F.C. players
Bloemfontein Celtic F.C. players
Moroka Swallows F.C. players
South Africa international soccer players